Volcano Vent is a small shield volcano in northern British Columbia, Canada. It is Holocene in age and stands in relief above the surrounding area north of the Nazcha Creek and comprises the West Tuya lava field with West Vent and Grizzly Butte. It is one of the three small shield volcanoes in the Tuya Volcanic Field which in turn form part of the Northern Cordilleran Volcanic Province. Most of the rock studied and sampled at Volcano Vent is massive coherent basalt.

See also

 List of volcanoes in Canada
 Volcanism of Western Canada

References

Cassiar Country
Volcanoes of British Columbia
One-thousanders of British Columbia
Shield volcanoes of Canada
Northern Cordilleran Volcanic Province
Holocene shield volcanoes
Monogenetic shield volcanoes
Stikine Plateau